Vesterinen Yhtyeineen is a Finnish indie pop group made up of six members with Tero Vesterinen as main vocalist. They are signed to Universal Music Finland. The debut album of the band, Jönköping, was released on 26 August 2009 with single "Mitä tapahtui Hokkasen Timolle" getting heavy airplay. The band was nominated for Best Newcomer during Emma awards in 2009.

Members
Tero Vesterinen – singer
Petri Kivimäki	– guitar
Mikko Enqvist – guitar
Markus Piha – bass
Janne Riionheimo – keyboards
Teemu Jokinen – drums

Discography

Albums

References

External links
Official website
Last.fm page

Finnish musical groups